Benoîte Groult (31 January 1920 – 20 June 2016) was a French journalist, writer, and feminist activist.

Life and career 
Groult was born on 31 January 1920 in Paris. She was the daughter of André Groult and Nicole Poiret, sister of Paul Poiret and herself a fashion designer, and was raised in the Parisian upper class. Groult attended the Sorbonne, where she studied Latin and Greek. After her studies in literature ended in 1953, she worked as a journalist for television. Before publishing her own book in 1972, she co-wrote three books with her younger sister Flora. On her own she eventually published twenty novels and numerous essays on feminism.

Because Benoîte Groult was a feminist, her novels often deal with topics such as the history of feminism, the discrimination of women and misogyny.

Her novel Les vaisseaux du cœur, published in 1988, was called pornographic by some because of its explicit sexual depictions. It was filmed by Andrew Birkin in 1992 as Salt on Our Skin.

In April 2010, she became Commander of the Légion d'honneur.

In popular culture 
Benoîte Groult was the subject of several documentary films. Anne Lefant devoted the documentary Une chambre à elle: Benoîte Groult ou comment la liberté vint aux femmes to Groult, who was 86 years old at the time. It includes testimonies of Josyane Savigneau, Paul Guimard and Yvette Roudy and was published in 2006 by Hors Champ Productions. In 2008 the documentary Benoîte Groult, le temps d'apprendre à vivre, written by Marie Mitterrand and directed by Jean-Baptiste Martin, aired on France 5 as a part of the series Empreintes.

In 2013 Grasset published a graphic novel based on the life of Benoîte Groult, called Ainsi soit Benoîte Groult, by the hand of Catel.

Personal life
Benoîte Groult was married three times. In 1944, she married medical student Pierre Heuyer, who died soon afterward of tuberculosis. In 1951, she married journalist Georges de Caunes with whom she had two daughters, Blandine and Lison. She later married the writer Paul Guimard (1921–2004). The couple had one daughter, Constance.

Benoîte Groult had a holiday home in Derrynane (Republic of Ireland) and spent the summer there from 1977 till 2003. The French president François Mitterrand visited her there in 1988.

Published books 
 1962: Journal à quatre mains, novel with her sister Flora Groult. Paris, Denoël. (English translation: Diary in duo. London, Barrie and Rockliff, 1965)
 1965: Le féminin pluriel, novel with her sister Flora Groult. (English translation: Feminine Plural. Englewood Cliffs, N.J: Prentice-Hall, 1968.) 
 1967: Il était deux fois, novel with her sister Flora Groult
 1972: La part des choses, Paris, Grasset. 
 1975: Ainsi soit-elle, essay on the social status of women, Paris: B. Grasset, 1975.  (Also: sound recording in 2004) 
 1977: Le féminisme au masculin, essay on feminism
 1981: La moitié de la terre, essay
 1983: Les trois quarts du temps, novel
 1986: Olympe de Gouges, text submitted by Benoîte Groult
 1988: Les vaisseaux du cœur, Paris, Grasset. 
 1991: Pauline Roland ou Comment la liberté vint aux femmes
 2006: La touche étoile
 2008: "Mon evasion", Paris, Grasset. .  (English translation: My Escape: An Autobiography. New York: Other Press, 2012.   )

Sources
 Flitner, Bettina: Frauen mit Visionen – 48 Europäerinnen (Women with visions – 48 Europeans). With texts by Alice Schwarzer. Munich: Knesebeck, 2004. , 100–103 p.

References

External links 

 
 
 „Finden Sie String-Tangas bequem?“ Tagesspiegel, 6. Mai 2007, Interview about aging
 Benoîte Groult photographed by Bettina Flitner

1920 births
2016 deaths
Writers from Paris
20th-century French novelists
21st-century French novelists
French women novelists
French feminists
Commandeurs of the Légion d'honneur
20th-century French women writers
21st-century French women writers